Christopher Samuel Paisley (born 24 March 1986) is an English professional golfer who currently plays on the Challenge Tour. In January 2018 he had his first win on the tour, the BMW SA Open.

Amateur career
Paisley played college golf at the University of Tennessee where he won two events. He played on the St Andrews Trophy team in 2008, the Palmer Cup and Walker Cup teams in 2009. He turned professional in 2010.

Professional career
Paisley won the first two events on the 2011 Alps Tour and started playing on the Challenge Tour the same year. In August he won his third Alps Tour event of the year. In 2012 he had his biggest success so far by winning the English Challenge. His performances on the Challenge Tour gave him a card for the 2013 European Tour season. He had limited success on the 2013 European Tour and returned to the Challenge Tour in 2014. He qualified again for the main tour through Q-School in late 2014.

Since 2015 Paisley has played mostly on the European Tour. He finished third place in the 2015 BMW International Open, the 2016 Italian Open and the 2017 Made in Denmark.

In January 2018, Paisley had his first European Tour victory by winning the BMW SA Open. The following week he finished fifth in the Abu Dhabi HSBC Championship, entering the world top-100 for the first time.

Professional wins (5)

European Tour wins (1)

1Co-sanctioned by the Sunshine Tour

Sunshine Tour wins (1)

1Co-sanctioned by the European Tour

Challenge Tour wins (1)

Alps Tour wins (3)

Results in World Golf Championships

"T" = Tied

Team appearances
Amateur
St Andrews Trophy (representing Great Britain and Ireland): 2008 (winners)
Palmer Cup (representing Europe): 2009 (winners)
Walker Cup (representing Great Britain and Ireland): 2009
European Amateur Team Championship (representing England): 2010 (winners)

See also
2012 Challenge Tour graduates
2014 European Tour Qualifying School graduates

References

External links

English male golfers
European Tour golfers
Tennessee Volunteers men's golfers
Sportspeople from Hexham
People from Stocksfield
1986 births
Living people